Michelle Lynn Lomnicki (born May 3, 1987) is an American former professional soccer player who played as a defender.

Early life
Born in Aurora, Colorado, to parents Pat and Sherri Wenino, Michelle attended Smoky Hill High School and played all four seasons for the girls soccer team. A four-sport, and 15-time letterwinner, she received the school's Athlete of the Year with Honors award in 2005. Wenino was a Tulsa All-Tournament team member in 2004 and received the Fair Play Award in 2000 State Cup play.  She was first-team Centennial league as a senior and second-team as a junior and was named MVP for Smoky Hill as a senior.  In 2003, the team were the 2003 Centennial League Champions.  Wenino also ran track (200-800m distances) and cross country as a member of the 2002, 2003 and 2004 5A state championship teams that finished second at nationals in 2004 in Portland, Oregon.  She was also a point guard on the school's basketball team that won the 2002 Centennial League Championship.

Club career

Chicago Red Stars (WPS), 2009
In 2009, Wenino played for Chicago Red Stars in the WPS during its inaugural season. She made one appearance during a game against Saint Louis Athletica at Toyota Park for a total of 34 minutes played.

SC Freiburg, 2010
In 2010, Wenino played for SC Freiburg. She played seven games with five starts for a total of 476 minutes, scoring one goal.

Sky Blue FC, 2011
In January 2011, Wenino signed with Sky Blue FC. She made three appearances and scored one goal.

Chicago Red Stars (NWSL), 2013–2015
In February 2013, Wenino joined Chicago Red Stars in the National Women's Soccer League. Wenino started 17 games and appeared in 18 games in the 22-game season, usually playing defender on the right wing.  She scored one goal and had one assist.

She announced her retirement on March 1, 2016.

Post playing

Lomnicki returned to the Chicago Red Stars in 2020 as the Director of Camps and Clinics. 
 In January of 2022 she was named the Associate General Manager, and in January of 2023 she was promoted to General Manager.

References

External links
 Chicago Red Stars player profile
 Colorado player profile
 Sky Blue FC player profile
 

Living people
1987 births
University of Colorado Boulder alumni
American expatriate soccer players in Germany
American women's soccer players
National Women's Soccer League players
SC Freiburg (women) players
Pali Blues players
NJ/NY Gotham FC players
USL W-League (1995–2015) players
Chicago Red Stars players
Women's Professional Soccer players
Women's association football defenders
Colorado Buffaloes women's soccer players
American expatriate women's soccer players
Women's Premier Soccer League Elite players